Jan Damesz de Veth (1595 in Gouda – 1625 in Gouda), was a Dutch Golden Age portrait painter.

Houbraken listed him with the Gouda painters Jan Franse Verzijl, and Jan and Pieter Donker as noteworthy artists that he intended to include in his book of biographies. His source was Beschrijving der stad Gouda by Ignatius Walvis.

According to the RKD he died in Gouda where he painted three schutterstukken dated 1615, 1619, and 1622 that hang today in the Gouda museum.

References

1595 births
1625 deaths
Dutch Golden Age painters
Dutch male painters
People from Gouda, South Holland